Dr. A. B. Nobles House and McKendree Church, also known as the McKendree Farm and Chosumneda, is a historic house and church located near Mercer, Edgecombe County, North Carolina. The house was built between 1865 and 1870, and is a two-story, Gothic Revival style brick cottage.  The McKendree Church was built about 1875, and is a simple, one-story frame structure, sheathed in weatherboard.

It was listed on the National Register of Historic Places in 1980.

References

Methodist churches in North Carolina
Houses on the National Register of Historic Places in North Carolina
Churches on the National Register of Historic Places in North Carolina
Gothic Revival architecture in North Carolina
Churches completed in 1875
Houses completed in 1865
Houses in Edgecombe County, North Carolina
Churches in Edgecombe County, North Carolina
National Register of Historic Places in Edgecombe County, North Carolina